L. W. Upshaw was an American football coach.  He was the third head football at Jamestown College—now known as the University of Jamestown—in Jamestown, North Dakota, serving for two seasons, from 1919 to 1920, and compiling a record of 1–1–1.

Head coaching record

References

Year of birth missing
Year of death missing
Jamestown Jimmies football coaches